Lippo Centre may refer to:

 Lippo Centre (Hong Kong), formerly named Bond Centre
 Lippo Centre (Singapore), a skyscraper